The Natchiowatchouan River is a tributary of the Nottaway River (via Lake Soscumica), in the administrative region of Nord-du-Québec, in the Canadian province of Quebec, in Canada. Most of the course of the river flows into Millet Township.

Forestry is the main economic activity of the sector. Recreational tourism (especially hunting and fishing) comes second, thanks to the navigable water body of Lake Soscumica, including the tributaries.

The west side of the lake is served by a winter road (North-South direction). The surface of the river is usually frozen from early November to mid-May, however, safe ice circulation is generally from mid-November to mid-April.

Geography 
The main neighboring hydrographic slopes are:
North side: Lake Soscumica, Nottaway River;
East side: Lake Soscumica, Nottaway River;
South side: Matagami Lake, Nottaway River, Bell River;
West side: Deux Lacs River, Lake Montreuil, Kitchigama River.

From its source, the Natchiowatchouan River flows over  according to the following segments:
 to the North, then to the Southwest, to a creek (coming from the South);
 northeasterly to the Millet township boundary;
 Northeast in the canton of Millet, to the limit of the cantons;
 to the North, to the outlet of a lake (coming from the North-West);
 southeasterly to its mouth.

The Natchiowatchouan River empties onto the western shore of Soscumica Lake. This confluence is located at:
 Southeast of the mouth of Lake Soscumica;
 Southeast of the mouth of the Nottaway River (confluence with Rupert Bay);
 North of downtown Matagami, Quebec;
 North of the mouth of the Matagami Lake.

Toponymy 
The toponym "Natchiowatchouan" was formalized on December 5, 1968, at the Commission de toponymie du Québec, i.e. at the creation of this commission

References

See also 
James Bay
Rupert Bay
Nottaway River
Lake Soscumica
List of rivers of Quebec

Rivers of Nord-du-Québec